Lakshminarasupeta is a village in Srikakulam district of the Indian state of Andhra Pradesh.

References 

Villages in Srikakulam district
Mandal headquarters in Srikakulam district